Rechnoy Vokzal (River Terminal) is a station on the Zamoskvoretskaya line of the Moscow Metro. It was opened on the New Year's Eve of 1965 and, until 2017, was the northern terminus of the line. It is named after the North River Terminal located nearby.

The design follows the standardized pillar-trispan design featuring white-flecked, brown marble pillars and tiled walls. The architects were N. Demchinsky and Yu. Kolesnikova. It has two identical vestibules, located at the intersection of Festivalnaya Street and the M10 highway.

Being one of the two closest subway stations to the Sheremetyevo International Airport (along with Planernaya, on the Tagansko-Krasnopresnenskaya line), Rechnoy Vokzal is connected to the airport by frequent bus and passenger van service. The bus and van terminal may move to Khovrino once the transport hub is completed there.

Until 1975, it was the northernmost station on the metro system and, until 2017, was the terminus of the line. Both Khovrino, which opened in December 2017, and Belomorskaya, which opened in 2018, have been completed, pushing the line further north.

References

Moscow Metro stations
Railway stations in Russia opened in 1964
Zamoskvoretskaya Line
Railway stations located underground in Russia